The 2011 season was the 20th full year of competitive football in the Baltic country as an independent nation.

Matches

Unofficial matches
Originally, the match against Bulgaria was recognised as a full international match by FIFA, but was later dismissed as the organizers were found guilty of match fixing. Referees Krisztián Selmeczi, János Csák and Kolos Lengyel were banned for life.

Players

Debutants
Eight new players appeared for the men's national team, all in a friendly match against Chile on 20 June 2011:
 Mikk Reintam (#220–222, JJK Jyväskylä) – started the match
 Joonas Tamm (#220–222, IFK Norrköping) – started the match
 Siim Tenno (#220–222, JK Tammeka Tartu) – started the match
 Joel Indermitte (#223–226, FC Viljandi) – 63rd-minute substitute
 Meelis Peitre (#223–226, FC Flora Tallinn) – 63rd-minute substitute
 Albert Prosa (#223–226, JK Tammeka Tartu) – 63rd-minute substitute
 Andrei Veis (#223–226, FC Viljandi) – 63rd-minute substitute
 Henri Anier (#227, FC Flora Tallinn) – 75th-minute substitute
National team appearance number and club at the time of debut in brackets.

Statistics

Goalkeepers

Outfield players

References

External links
 All national team games

2011
National
2011 national football team results